Harri Anne Smith (born January 20, 1962) is a former independent member of the Alabama Senate, representing the 29th District from 1998 to 2018. She has been elected to three terms in the state senate and is also a former mayor of her hometown of Slocomb, in the Wiregrass Region.

Early life, education, and early political career
Smith was born in Houston County, Alabama and graduated from Slocomb High School. She has a B.A. in business administration from Troy State University. She was executive vice president of Friend Bank. She was a member of the board of directors and served as president of Slocomb National Bank.

She started her political career in 1989 as an appointed member of the Slocomb City Council. She was then elected to the Slocomb city council (non-partisan) and elected mayor in 1996.

Alabama Senate

Elections
In 1998, she challenged Republican state senator Chip Bailey of Alabama's 29th senate district. She defeated him in the primary 47%-44%. In November, she defeated Democratic nominee Mac Palmer 61%-39%.

In 2002, she won re-election to a second term unopposed. In 2006, she won re-election to a third term, defeating Democratic nominee Ronnie Helms 75%-25%.

Afterwards, she endorsed the Democratic nominee, Bobby Bright—a decision which nearly got her expelled from the Geneva County Republican Executive Committee.

The Republican Party of Alabama barred her from running for reelection to her state senate seat as a Republican in 2010; her endorsement of Bright violated a state party bylaw which bars an elected Republican from endorsing a candidate from another party when a Republican is running. However, in June she garnered enough signatures in her district to run as an independent.  She won re-election to a fourth term, defeating Republican challenger George Flowers 55%-45%.

A month before the election, she had been indicted on federal charges of bribery and corruption. Smith was found not guilty and was acquitted of all charges in March 2012.

Notwithstanding her disagreements with (and expulsion from) the Republican Party, Smith caucuses with them on issues.

Committee assignments
 Commerce, Transportation, and Utilities
 Confirmations (vice chair)
 Health
 Local Legislation Number 1
 Tourism and Marketing
 Veterans and Military Affairs

Personal life
Her husband, Charlie Smith, is a native of Geneva County, Alabama and serves as a colonel in the United States Army Reserve. Harri Anne and Charlie live in Slocomb, where they are members of the First Baptist Church.

References

External links 
 Alabama State Legislature – Senator Harri Anne Smith official government website
 Project Vote Smart – Senator Harri Anne Smith (AL) profile
 Follow the Money – Harri Anne Smith
 2006 2002 1998 campaign contributions
 News Release On Senator Smith's Bright Endorsement from the ALGOP

1962 births
Living people
Alabama city council members
Alabama state senators
Women mayors of places in Alabama
Alabama Independents
Mayors of places in Alabama
People acquitted of corruption
People from Geneva County, Alabama
People from Houston County, Alabama
Troy University alumni
Women state legislators in Alabama
Alabama Republicans
Women city councillors in Alabama
21st-century American politicians
21st-century American women politicians
Candidates in the 2008 United States elections